Mount Weiss is a mountain in Alberta, Canada located on the western side of the Sunwapta River valley of Jasper National Park, and is part of the Winston Churchill Range. The mountain was named in 1972 after Joe Weiss (1896-1993), who had spent 45 years of his life exploring and guiding in Jasper.

See also
 Geography of Alberta

References

Three-thousanders of Alberta
Winston Churchill Range
Mountains of Jasper National Park